Sushi Pack is an animated action-adventure television series created by Studio Espinosa and developed by Tom Ruegger and Nicholas Hollander. Produced by DIC Entertainment Corporation and CloudCo, Inc. the show aired for two seasons and 52 episodes on the KEWLopolis programming block of CBS from November 3, 2007 to February 28, 2009.

This show, along with DinoSquad, were the final two series produced by DIC before their acquisition with Cookie Jar Entertainment, who produced the second and final season of Sushi Pack until the series ended its run in 2009. Cookie Jar (along with the DiC library) would be acquired by DHX Media (now known as WildBrain) in 2012.

Premise 
The series centres on a fictional superhero team of anthropomorphic remains of sushi and/or common sushi ingredients (wasabi, salmon, crab, tuna and, octopus) that had become sentient after getting hit by a lightning storm. They use their "wits and powers" to save the world from dastardly villains. Morals featured throughout the series involve learning about friendship, cooperation skills, and teamwork.

Characters

Sushi Pack
 Tako Maki (voiced by Rick Adams) is a blue octopus who is the self-proclaimed leader of the team. He has six long tentacle arms and a fake eye patch and speaks in a British accent. Despite being part of the team, he would rather use his powers of shooting multi-colored ink to be a world-renowned painter than to fight evil.
 Maguro Maki (voiced by Tara Strong) is a magenta tuna who is the backbone and spiritual guru of the team. She possesses the ability to concentrate intensely, resulting in her gaining psychic powers, including levitation, mind-reading, telekinesis and getting "in tune with her inner tuna". She is also friends with mochi mochiato, despite them being on opposites sides of good and evil.
 Ikura Maki (voiced by Andrew Francis) is an orange salmon who is impulsive, headstrong and competitive. He tends to jump into action without thinking, which causes tension between him and the pack. He has the power to shoot sticky fish eggs from his hands. Ikura also has a fear of bears, including those that don't harm him such as gummy bears. 
 Kani Maki (voiced by Chiara Zanni) is a tomboyish, grumpy, and brainy pink crab whose pigtails are tough crab claws, which she uses to give her foes powerful pinches. She is often sarcastic and often claims that other people are "making me crabby". In spite of that, she has her fair share of kindness and usually acts as a mechanic/engineer of the team. she also seems to be interested in Geology.
 Wasabi Pow (voiced by Scott McNeil) is a green wasabi creature who is the smallest and cutest member of the Sushi Pack, as well as the powerhouse of the team. A spicy ball of hot mustard, he speaks hot sauce and can only communicate with unintelligible squeaky noises (despite this, his teammates have no trouble understanding him), as well as having the power to shoot fireballs at his foes. he is the only one able to stand high temperatures as the sushi pack's weakness is heat.

Legion of Low Tide
 Titanium Chef (voiced by Adam Behr) is a sushi chef catfish who not only orders the Legion of Low Tide to fight dirty and scheme evil plots, but also manages the sushi bar they live in, mostly using the Book of Chum Chop, which might be inspired by the Necronomicon. He is often rude, and demeaning to the legion of lowtide members even when they want to help with his schemes.
 Fugu (voiced by Scott McNeil) is a blowfish who can puff himself up to many times his original size. He mostly acts as the leader of the team like Tako. He has an eye that also functions as a camera, implying that he may be a cyborg.
 Toro (voiced by Vincent Tong) is a very fatty tuna who is not very smart. He acts as powerhouse of the team like Wasabi, and is strong but gullible, he usually ends up following the lead of others. He is also kind, as seen in the episode "the sign of tuna".
 Uni (voiced by Samuel Vincent) is an unstoppable sea urchin with a talent for shapeshifting into objects and people. He is one of the Sushi Pack's biggest threats, due to being unpredictable. He speaks with a Jamaican accent.
 Unagi (voiced by Brian Dobson) is a mutated electric eel and slimy savage with an eye for detail. Possessing the ability of electrokinesis, he and fugu argue and seem to fight over who gets to be leader sometimes. He helps the Sushi Pack on occasion.
 Mochi Macchiato (voiced by Jeannie Elias) is a mochi ice cream creature who freezes her enemies in their tracks. She is candy coated but cold as ice, as she can freeze anything she touches. She is a bit of a klutz and is very girly, loving dress-up and pop-music. She befriends maguro and later kani in "Deep Freeze".

Other characters
 Ben (voiced by Samuel Vincent) is a close friend of the Sushi Pack, as well as the manager of the vegan doughnut shop where they live. He always gives them advice or suggestions.
 Mayor Hack Martin is the mayor of Wharf City who calls on the Sushi Pack during emergencies.
 Jenny Flume is the chief of police who usually has something she'd rather be doing than talking to the Sushi Pack, such as going to the movies or playing golf with Mayor Martin.
 Satel-Lightning (voiced by Michael Daingerfield) is a mechanical monster created via fusion of a meteor and satellite. He is initially hostile, but ultimately becomes a friend of the Sushi Pack. He is later seen giving advice to them about teamwork in the episode "In Hot Water" while being stuck in a crack in the ocean floor.
 Hideki (voiced by Maryke Hendrikse) is Tako's cousin, who is a purple squid. She is very kind and sweet towards the pack. In "Deep Sea Diver Dude" Hideki spent years trying to find tako, and when she does, she invites tako to a family reunion. The rest of the sushi pack are suspicious and almost ruin the reunion, but at the end it was a misunderstanding, and they are happy for tako for finding his long lost family, and become honorary octopi to his family.
 Pipin' Hot A is a formerly evil piece of cookie dough with an egg beater stuck in his head, created by Ben. At the end of "Dough-Ray-Me" he seems to become friendly and reformed, working on a farm milking cows with other cookie dough creatures.
 Sophia Tucker is a reporter who appears on the news often, making comments about the sushi pack, events and other jaw-dropping news.
 Cataplatopus is a weird mutant hybrid with cybernetics. He has a australian accent and says the phrase "Meow-Quack!" often, and was also Ben's favorite hero when he was a child. He is egotistical and deathly afraid of mice.
 Insecto is another hero, a combo between a fly and a bumblebee, self proclaimed "King Of All Insects". His weakness is honey and has a high-pitched voice.
 The Prom Princess of Power is a prom themed superheroine with the flowerpower of invisibility, but can lose the powers if her flower on her chest wilts. She is married to Fantastic Fellow and often proclaims as the most "coolest, most powerful and cutest hero of all!". 
 Fantastic Fellow & Gastro: A superhero with the strength of ten men, but his weakness is turkey gobbling. He is married to The Prom Princess of Power; his dog Gastro is a old raspy dog with a heart of gold, and loves him a lot.
 Murphey Pilbean is the art museum's director, an eccentric kind old man with a love of art, but he doesn't like tako's art very much though.

Villains
 Apex
 The Collector
 The Legion of Lowtide & Titanium Chef
 Sir Darkly
 Oleandar
 Hot Squad
 Paradoxter
 Baron Von Loudly (voiced by Peter New)
 Trashasarus
 General Anesthetic
 Jimmy Sweet Tooth
 Dr. Naught
 A Egomanical Frozen Pea

Series overview

Episodes

Season 1 (2007-2008)

Season 2 (2008-2009)

References

2007 American television series debuts
2009 American television series endings
2000s American animated television series
2007 Canadian television series debuts
2009 Canadian television series endings
2000s Canadian animated television series
American children's animated action television series
American children's animated adventure television series
American children's animated comedy television series
American children's animated education television series
American children's animated superhero television series
American flash animated television series
Anime-influenced Western animated television series
Canadian children's animated action television series
Canadian children's animated adventure television series
Canadian children's animated comedy television series
Canadian children's animated education television series
Canadian children's animated superhero television series
Canadian flash animated television series
CBS original programming
English-language television shows
Sushi
Television series by DIC Entertainment
Television series by Cookie Jar Entertainment
Television series by DHX Media